The Chinese Hockey Association is the governing body of field hockey in People's Republic of China. It is affiliated to IHF International Hockey Federation and AHF Asian Hockey Federation. The headquarters of the federation are in Beijing, China.

Jun Lei is the President of the Chinese Hockey Association and Weifeng Zong is the General Secretary.

See also
 China men's national field hockey team
 China women's national field hockey team

References

External links
 Chinese Hockey Association

China
Hockey
Field hockey in China